The Saints Constantine and Helen Serbian Orthodox Church is a Serbian Orthodox church located in Galveston, Texas, United States.  It is a parish of the Serbian Orthodox Diocese of New Gracanica - Midwestern America.

History
The eastern orthodox community had existed in the port city of Galveston since 1861 as the parish of Saints Constantine and Helen. By the late 1800s a group of Serbs, Greeks, and Russians appealed to the Holy Synod of the Russian Orthodox Church in St. Petersburg, Russia, and Tsar Nicholas II for a church.  The Tsar approved the establishment of a church and in 1895 construction began.  The building was finished in 1896 and consecration took place on the feast day of Saint Constantine and Saint Helen.  Tsar Nicholas II also personally donated icons for the Iconostasis, a gospel book, and a number of sacred vessels.  The first priest assigned to the new church was Archimandrite Theoclitos (Triantafilides).  Services were originally held in Greek, Russian and Serbian; however, in 1933 the Greek members of the church voted to create a "daughter parish" of Sts. Constantine and Helen and operate it under the Greek Orthodox Church, naming their new church Assumption of the Virgin Mary Greek Orthodox Church.

Saints Constantine and Helen Serbian Orthodox Church was the first Serbian Orthodox church in the state and its parish is the oldest Orthodox parish in Texas.  The church also holds the distinction of being the second oldest Serbian Orthodox church in the United States.

Notable clergy
Galveston native, Metropolitan Bishop Christopher Kovacevich of the Metropolitanate of Libertyville-Chicago, was born and raised as a member of Saints Constantine and Helen church.  As an adult and Metropolitan, he would frequently return to the city and preside at church weddings and baptisms.

Gallery

See also

Serbian Orthodox Church
Serbian American

References

Sources

External links
 "Diocese." Diocese of New Gracanica - Midwestern America.

Greek-American culture in Texas
Russian-American culture
Serbian-American history
Churches completed in 1896
Churches in Texas
Churches in Galveston, Texas
Serbian Orthodox church buildings in the United States
Religious organizations established in 1861
19th-century Serbian Orthodox church buildings
1861 establishments in Texas